Nico Hischier (born 4 January 1999) is a Swiss professional ice hockey centre and captain of the New Jersey Devils of the National Hockey League (NHL). Hischier made his professional debut in his native Switzerland in 2015, spending time both in the top-tier National League A (NLA) and the second-tier National League B. He moved to North America for the 2016–17 season to play major junior hockey for the Halifax Mooseheads of the Quebec Major Junior Hockey League (QMJHL) in hopes of furthering his hockey career; in his first season in the QMJHL, he was named rookie of the year, along with the award for best rookie in the Canadian Hockey League (CHL), the governing body for major junior hockey in Canada. Internationally Hischier has represented Switzerland at several junior tournaments, including two World Junior Championships. Regarded as a strong two-way forward and a top prospect for the 2017 NHL Entry Draft, Hischier was selected first overall by the Devils, the first time a Swiss player was selected first overall, and made his NHL debut in 2017. He was named captain of the Devils in 2021.

Playing career

Switzerland and major junior
Hischier participated in the 2011 and 2012 Quebec International Pee-Wee Hockey Tournaments with a youth team from Zürich. He grew up playing in the EHC Visp program. At the age of 15, he moved from his native canton of Valais, in the south of Switzerland, to Bern and joined SC Bern, following his brother Luca, who had done the same at that age; this allowed Hischier to play at the top levels of the Swiss under-17 and under-20 leagues. He began the 2015–16 season with EHC Visp, an affiliate of SC Bern, in the National League B, the second-highest Swiss league. However, due to several players being out with injuries in Bern, Hischier was brought to the top team on 13 November that year, playing with his brother. Hischier would play 15 games with Bern, spending most of the season with Visp.

The Halifax Mooseheads, a major junior team in the Quebec Major Junior Hockey League (QMJHL), selected Hischier sixth overall in the 2016 Canadian Hockey League (CHL) Import Draft, conducted between the three Canadian major junior leagues (the QMJHL, the Ontario Hockey League, and the Western Hockey League). After discussions with both Halifax's general manager and Swiss former Mooseheads player Timo Meier, Hischier committed to joining Halifax. Hischier's first season with the Mooseheads saw him finish second to Maxime Fortier for the team scoring lead, and tenth overall in the QMJHL, with 38 goals and 86 points. He also led all QMJHL rookies in both goals and points. For this Hischier was awarded the RDS Cup for being the QMJHL Rookie of the Year and the Michael Bossy Trophy as the best professional prospect in the league. He was additionally named to the QMJHL Rookie All-Star Team. He would also be named the rookie of the year for the CHL, which oversees the three major junior leagues. In the playoffs he led Halifax in scoring with seven points in six games.

Regarded as a top prospect going into the 2017 NHL Entry Draft, by the conclusion of the season Hischier was regarded as a candidate to be selected first overall. Ranked the second-best North American skater in the NHL Central Scouting Bureau final list prior to the draft, Hischier was highly regarded as a tremendous offensive talent with exceptional hockey sense. Hischier was also regarded as a strong two-way player, and well-regarded for his strong skating abilities. In the lead-up to the draft Hischier was regarded as a consensus top-two pick along with Nolan Patrick.

New Jersey Devils

Hischier was selected with the first overall pick in the 2017 NHL Entry Draft by the New Jersey Devils, becoming the first Swiss player to be drafted first overall. He signed a three-year, entry-level contract with the Devils on 15 July 2017. After a strong training camp and preseason, where he led the Devils in scoring with seven points in four games, Hischier made the opening-day roster. His NHL debut came on 7 October against the Colorado Avalanche. He recorded his first point, an assist, on 9 October in his second game, against the Buffalo Sabres, while his first two goals came ten days later against Craig Anderson of the Ottawa Senators. Hischier finished the regular season as the Devils' second best scorer (behind Hart Trophy-winning linemate Taylor Hall) with 52 points, including 20 goals and 32 assists. His performance helped the team secure their first playoff berth since 2012. After the Devils were eliminated from the 2018 Stanley Cup playoffs in five games by the top-seeded Tampa Bay Lightning, Hischier revealed he had been playing with a hand injury that kept him out of the 2018 IIHF World Championship.

In his sophomore season with the Devils, Hischier completed the 2018–19 season with 47 points in 69 games. With an injured Hall out of the lineup for a large portion of the season, he recorded a team leading Corsi-For percentage, scoring chances for percentage, and high-danger chances for percentage. Despite this, the Devils performed poorly as a team and missed the 2019 Stanley Cup playoffs.

Prior to the 2019–20 season, Hischier played with the Swiss Ice Hockey Federation national team prospects camp. On 16 October 2019, the Devils announced Hischier suffered an upper-body injury during a game against the Florida Panthers. Two days later, the Devils signed Hischier to a seven-year, $50.75 million contract extension, despite the ability to become a restricted free agent. The Devils' performance woes continued through 2019–20, and saw Hischier's linemate Hall traded from the team. The season was shortened by the COVID-19 pandemic; having finished in the bottom seven teams at the time of the regular season's pause and eventual cancellation, the Devils were eliminated from playoff contention by default. Hischier played a total of 58 of the team's 69 games, scoring a total of 14 goals and 36 points in the abbreviated season.

Due to a leg injury suffered prior to training camp, Hischier missed the start of the 2020–21 season. Hischier made his season debut on 20 February 2021, against the Buffalo Sabres, where he was announced as the 12th captain in the Devils' history before the game. As such, he became the youngest captain in the league. Hischier would play only five games before suffering another injury against the Washington Capitals when a shot from Devils defenceman P. K. Subban hit Hischier in the face. Although the injury initially only projected him to miss three weeks of NHL action, the surgery for Hischier's broken nose ended up sidelining him a total of 24 games. Despite playing only 21 games that season, he would finish with six goals and five assists as the Devils once again missed the playoffs.

International play

Hischier's international tournament was the 2015 IIHF World U18 Championships, hosted in his native Switzerland. Hischier scored one goal as the Swiss team finished fourth overall. He next played in the 2015 Ivan Hlinka Memorial Tournament, a tournament not regulated by the International Ice Hockey Federation but still considered a major event for under-18 players; Hischier recorded six points over four games. At the 2016 IIHF World U18 Championships he had four points as Switzerland placed eighth.

At the 2016 World Junior Championships Hischier was the youngest player for Switzerland, and the second-youngest player overall. He also participated in the 2017 World Juniors, scoring four goals and had seven total points in five games, the most by any player eligible for the 2017 NHL Entry Draft. Hischier also partook at the 2017 IIHF World U18 Championships, and finished with six points in five games as Switzerland lost in the quarter-finals.

Hischier was selected to represent Switzerland at the 2019 IIHF World Championship. In Switzerlands 9–0 win over Italy, he recorded one goal and two assists. Hischier would end the tournament with nine points in eight games.

Playing style
Described as a well-rounded player, capable of offence and strong defence, Hischier has been compared to former NHL player Pavel Datsyuk, who was renowned as a skilled two-way forward. Hischier himself has made the comparison, and has stated that he models his own style after Datsyuk, even wearing the same number, 13. After being selected by the Devils, general manager Ray Shero cited both Hischier's speed and commitment to defence as reasons for picking him first overall, seeing it as ideal for the team. Head coach John Hynes, speaking after the draft, commended Hischier on "how he competes on the puck and his speed, skill set and hockey sense," saying they were already "at an NHL level."

Personal life
Hischier comes from a family of athletes; his father Rino played football for FC Naters and his mother Katja worked as a sports teacher. He is the youngest of three siblings, with an older brother, Luca, and sister, Nina. Luca plays for EHC Biel in the NL, while Nina played volleyball at a high level in Switzerland. There were no rinks in Naters, so Katja took both her sons to nearby Visp to learn to skate and they discovered hockey there. Hischier also played football until he was 12, but followed Luca and focused exclusively on hockey. Hischier is an avid supporter of Premier League club Manchester City F.C.

After the 2018–19 season ended, Hischier began his civic military service process in his home country of Switzerland.

Career statistics

Regular season and playoffs

International

Awards and honors

References

External links
 
 

1999 births
Living people
EHC Visp players
Expatriate ice hockey players in Canada
Expatriate ice hockey players in the United States
Halifax Mooseheads players
National Hockey League first-overall draft picks
National Hockey League first-round draft picks
New Jersey Devils draft picks
New Jersey Devils players
People from Brig-Glis
People from Naters
SC Bern players
Swiss ice hockey centres
Swiss expatriate ice hockey people
Swiss expatriate sportspeople in Canada
Swiss expatriate sportspeople in the United States
Sportspeople from Valais